Alan Ker Stout (9 May 1900 – 20 July 1983) was a moral philosopher working at the University of Sydney, who also wrote on cinema. His father was G. F. Stout, British philosopher.

Biography
Stout gained his MA at Oxford in 1924 and, in June of that year, he was appointed to an assistant lectureship at the University College of North Wales in Bangor, under Professor James Gibson. In this period he published three articles on Descartes and produced plays. He married Evelyn Roberts in 1927, an undergraduate leading lady in his theatre productions.

He was appointed Lecturer in Moral Philosophy at the University of Edinburgh in 1934. His mother, Isabella Ker (born in 1855), died at St Andrews in 1935. In June 1939, having applied for the  position at the suggestion of Professor John Anderson (philosopher), he commenced a career in the foundation Chair of Moral and Political Philosophy at the University of Sydney, Australia. He taught in Sydney until his retirement in 1965. He was the president of the New South Wales Film Council, and officer of Unesco for films.

His Sydney University appointment was meant to diminish the influence of John Anderson, a controversial atheistic philosopher whose opinions were at odds with the university and the Christian establishment of the state of New South Wales. Stout was supposed to teach the "sensitive" subjects, like moral and political philosophy, while Anderson taught logic and metaphysics. There was no genuine opposition between both philosophers though, because Stout ended up generally supporting Anderson's ideas.

From 1950 to 1967, Alan K. Stout was the editor of the Australasian Journal of Philosophy.

Major publications

Books 
Documentary films, Sydney, 1944
Making films in Australia, Melbourne : Australian National Film Board, 1946. 
Abortion law reform, Sydney, 1968.

Articles
"The Basis of Knowledge in Descartes", Mind, New Series, Vol. 38, No. 151, (Jul., 1929), pp. 330–342. 
"The Basis of Knowledge in Descartes" (II), Mind, New Series, Vol. 38, No. 152, (Oct., 1929), pp. 458–472. 
"Descartes' Proof of the Existence of Matter", Mind, New Series, Vol. 41, No. 162, (Apr., 1932), pp. 191–207. 
"Symposium: Can Philosophy Determine What Is Ethically or Socially Valuable?",  J. L. Stocks, A. K. Stout, W. D. Lamont, Proceedings of the Aristotelian Society, Supplementary Volumes, Vol. 15, What can Philosophy Determine?, (1936), pp. 189–235
"Free Will and Responsibility", Proceedings of the Aristotelian Society, 37 (1936–37), reprinted in Readings in Ethical Theory, selected and edited by Wilfrid Sellars and John Hospers, New York: Appleton-Century-Crofts, 1952. 
"But Suppose Everyone Did the Same", Australasian Journal of Philosophy 32, 1954, pp. 1–29.

Further reading
D. H. Monro, "Obituary Alan Ker Stout, 1900-1983", Australasian Journal of Philosophy, 61:3 (1983), pp. 337–339. 
J. Franklin, Corrupting the Youth: A History of Philosophy in Australia, Sydney 2003, ch. 5.

References

1900 births
1983 deaths
People educated at Fettes College
Alumni of Oriel College, Oxford
Academics of the University of Edinburgh
British philosophers
Academic staff of the University of Sydney
20th-century Australian philosophers